This list of passenger ship companies is of companies that own and operate passenger ships, including cruise ships, cargo-passenger ships, and ferries (for passengers and automobiles).

For the list of companies that own and operate freight ships (bulk carriers, car carriers, container ships, roll-on/roll-off (for freight), and tankers), see list of freight ship companies.

For shipping agencies, or companies that own and operate tugboats and fishing ships, see the category for shipping companies by country.

Key
 " " - call sign or common name
 - parent company or conglomerate
 > - previous company name
 >> - company name in local language
 CR - cruise ships
 CP - cargo-passenger ships
 FR - ferries (for passengers and automobiles)

Africa

Mauritius
Mauritius Shipping Corporation Ltd.

Morocco
Africa Morocco Link

Tunisia
Compagnie Tunisienne de Navigation

Asia

Azerbaijan
CASPAR

Bangladesh
Agarpur Navigation
M/S Rabeya Shiping Co.
M/S Salma Shiping Corporation
Sundarban Navigation
Surovi/Crescent Shipping

China
China-Japan International Ferry, "CHINJIF"

Hong Kong

Indonesia
 ASDP Indonesia Ferry
 Pelni

Iran
 IRISL

Israel
Mano Maritime
Zim Integrated Shipping Services

Lebanon
Abou Merhi Cruises

Turkey
İDO
İZDENİZ
Gestaş
Turyol
Turkish Maritime Organization

Japan
A-Line Ferry - FR
Camellia Line - FR
Ferry Sunflower (MOL Group) - FR
Hankyu Ferry (SHK Line Group) - FR
Higashi Nihon Ferry - FR
Kampu Ferry (SHK Line Group) - FR
Kawasaki Kinkai Kisen, "Silver Ferry" (Kawasaki Kisen Kaisha) - FR
Meimon Taiyo Ferry (MOL Group) - FR
MOL Ferry (MOL Group) - CR, FR
Ocean Tokyu Ferry - FR
Orient Ferry (SHK Line Group) - FR
Seikan Ferry (Kita Nihon Kaiun, and Kyoei Unyu)
Shanghai Ferry
Shanghai Shimonoseki Ferry
Shin Nihonkai Ferry (SHK Line Group) -FR
Taiheiyō Ferry - FR
Tokyo-Wan Ferry - FR
Tsugaru Kaikyō Ferry - FR

Presently, no service for passengers
Kawasaki Kisen Kaisha, "K Line"
Mitsui O.S.K. Lines, "MOL" (Mitsui Group)
Nippon Yusen Kaisha, "NYK" (Mitsubishi Group)

Defunct
Diamond Ferry (MOL Group) (merged into Ferry Sunflower)
Kansai Kisen (merged into Ferry Sunflower)

Malaysia
 Rapid Ferry

Pakistan
 No ships

Philippines
2GO Travel 
Aleson Shipping Lines
Archipelago Philippine Ferries Corporation (FastCat)
Asian Marine Transport Corporation
Cokaliong Shipping Lines 
Lite Shipping Corporation
Montenegro Shipping Lines
Ocean Fast Ferries, Inc. (Ocean Jet) 
Starlite Ferries
Starhorse Shipping Lines
SuperCat Fast Ferry Corporation
Trans-Asia Shipping Lines
Medallion Transport Inc.

Singapore
Star Cruise
cmv shipping

Sri Lanka
 Canadian Star Line Sri Lanka

Europe

Croatia
Jadrolinija
Mediteranska

Cyprus
Louis Cruise Lines (Louis Group)

Denmark
Arctic Umiaq Line A/S
Bornholmstrafikken
DFDS Seaways (DFDS A/S)
Mols-Linien (Clipper Group, Bahamas)
Scandlines

Estonia
Tallink

Faroe Islands
Smyril Line

Finland
Ålandstrafiken
Birka Cruise (Eckero Line)
Eckerö Line
Finnlines (Grimaldi Group, Italy)
Kristina Cruises
Sally Cruise (Rederi Ab Sally)
Silja Line (Tallink, Estonia)
Viking Line
Wasa Line

Defunct
Effoa
Jakob Lines
Rederi Ab Sally
RG Line

France
Brittany Ferries (BAI Bretagne Angleterre Irlande S.A.)
Compagnie du Ponant
Corsica Ferries
LD Lines (Louis Dreyfus Group)
SNCM (Veolia Transport)

Defunct
Compagnie Générale Transatlantique
Fabre Line
Messageries Maritimes
SeaFrance (SNCF)

Germany
AIDA cruises
Phoenix Reisen
TT-Line
TUI cruises

Defunct
F. Laeisz
Norddeutscher Lloyd, "NDL"

Greece
ANEK Lines
Blue Star Ferries
Hellenic Seaways
Maritime Company of Lesvos
Minoan Lines
Superfast Ferries
Sea Jets
Fast Ferries
Golden Star Ferries
ANES Ferries
Nova Ferries
Chandris Line
Epirotiki Line
Greek Line

Ireland
B&I Line
Fastnet Line
Irish Ferries
Norse Merchant Ferries

Isle of Man
Isle of Man Steam Packet Company

Italy
Costa Crociere
Grimaldi Lines (Grimaldi Group)
Home Lines
Lauro Lines
Moby Lines
MSC Cruises
SNAV
Tirrenia di Navigazione

Defunct
Cosulich Line
Italian Line

Lithuania
DFDS Lisco (DFDS A/S, Denmark)

Monaco
Victory Carriers

Montenegro
Montenegro Lines >> Barska plovidba

Netherlands
Holland America Line
Norfolkline (DFDS A/S, Denmark)

Defunct
Netherland Line >> Stoomvaart Maatschappij Nederland

Norway
Bergen Steamship Company, "Bergen", >> Bergenske Dampskibsselskab, "BDS"
Boreal Sjø
Color Line
Fjord Line
Fjord1
FosenNamsos Sjø
Fred. Olsen Cruise Lines
Hurtigruten
Kystlink
Norled
Norwegian Cruise Line
Torghatten Nord
Torghatten Trafikkselskap

Defunct
Finnmark Fylkesrederi og Ruteselskap
Helgelandske
Norwegian America Line
Royal Viking Line
Thoresen Car Ferries (merged into P&O European Ferries, UK)

Poland
Polferries > Polish Baltic Shipping Company >> Polska Żegluga Bałtycka "PŻB"
Unity Line (Polish Steamship Company) – FR

Russia
Sakhalin Shipping Company, "SASCO"
Russian Steam Navigation and Trading Company (defunct)

Spain
Compañía Transmediterránea
Fred. Olsen Express
Baleària
Defunct
Compañía Transatlántica Española, "Spanish Line"
Vapores Transatlánticos Españoles  A Folch
Vapores Transatlánticos Pinillos Izquierdo
Ybarra
Naviera Aznar
Compañía de Vapores Correo A Lopez

Sweden
Destination Gotland
Stena Line

Defunct
Swedish American Line

United Kingdom
Caledonian MacBrayne
Cunard Line (Carnival Corporation & plc)
Finnburg Switzer
Hovertravel
Isles of Scilly Steamship Company
Peninsular and Oriental Steam Navigation Company, "P&O" (DP World, UAE)
P&O Ferries
Sally Line UK (Rederi Ab Sally, Finland)
Seatruck Ferries (Clipper Group, Bahamas)
Swan Hellenic
Thomson Cruises

Defunct
Anchor Line
Alfred Holt and Company, "Blue Funnel Line"
Blue Star Line
Bristol City Line
British India Steam Navigation Company, "British India Line"
British Railways ships
Clan Line
Court Line
Douglas Lapraik & Company (Hong Kong)
Douglas Steamship Company (Hong Kong)
Elder Dempster Line
Ellerman Line
European Ferries (Merged into P&O Ferries)
Evan Thomas Radcliffe
Fyffes Line
Hong Kong, Canton & Macao Steamboat Company (Hong Kong)
Hoverspeed
Loch Line
Manchester Liners
New Zealand Shipping Company
Ocean Village
Olau Line
Orient Steam Navigation Company, "Orient Line"
Pacific Steam Navigation Company
Palm Line
Port Line
Red Star Line
Shaw, Savill & Albion Line
Silver Line
Townsend Bros. Ferries (merged into P&O Ferries)
Townsend Thoresen (merged into P&O Ferries)
Union-Castle Line
White Star Line

North America

Canada
BC Ferries
Canadian Star Line
Marine Atlantic (crown corporation)

Mexico

 Baja Ferries

United States
Carnival Cruise Line
Crystal Cruises (Nippon Yusen Kaisha, Japan)
Holland America Line (Carnival Corporation & plc)
Princess Cruises (Carnival Corporation & plc)
Transformed Services Inc (North America to the world)

South America

Chile
Cruce Andino
Cruceros Skorpios

Oceania

Australia
TT-Line Company (Government of Tasmania)

Fiji
Patterson Brothers Shipping Company LTD
Miller Shipping Services
Venu Shipping Limited

Nauru
Nauru Pacific Line

New Zealand
Fullers Ferries (Fullers Group)
Interislander Line (KiwiRail)
Reef Shipping (Reef Group)
Strait Shipping (Bluebridge)
Union Steam Ship Company (P&O Line, UK)

References 

Passenger